Hobbseus attenuatus, the Pearl riverlet crayfish, is a species of crayfish in the family Cambaridae. It is endemic to Mississippi.

References

Further reading

 
 

Cambaridae
Articles created by Qbugbot
Crustaceans described in 1969
Freshwater crustaceans of North America
Endemic fauna of Mississippi